Le Retour was a 1964 novel by Michel Droit, published by Éditions Julliard and winning the Grand Prix du roman de l'Académie française for 1964.

1964 French novels
Éditions Julliard books